South Korean R&B trio Urban Zakapa have released five studio albums, four extended plays, and seven singles. Originally a nine-member group, Urban Zakapa debuted with the song "Coffee" (커피를 마시고) in 2009.

Studio albums

Extended plays

Singles

As lead artist

As featured artist

Promotional singles

Collaborations

Other charted songs

Soundtrack appearances

Other appearances

Notes

References

External links
 Urban Zakapa discography on Melon

Discographies of South Korean artists
Rhythm and blues discographies
K-pop music group discographies